A chandelier is a decorative ceiling-mounted light fixture.

Chandelier may also refer to:

 "Chandelier" (song), a 2014 song by Sia
 Chandelier (Plastic Tree album), 2006
 Chandelier (Rachael Sage album), 2008
 "Chandelier", a song by Idlewild from their 2009 album Post Electric Blues
 "Chandelier", a song by Stan Walker from his 2010 album From the Inside Out
 Chandelier, 2008 album by Factor
 Chandeliers (band), an electronic ensemble from Chicago

See also
 Le Chandelier, an 1835 play
 Chandelier Tree, a redwood tree in Leggett, California
 Shanda Lear, daughter of Bill Lear who founded the Lear Jet company
 Chandelier bidding, a bidding strategy in auctions
 Chandeleur (disambiguation)